Alectoria may refer to:
Alectoria (fungus), a genus of lichenized fungi
Alectoria (katydid), genus of bush crickets or katydids in the family Tettigoniidae, subfamily Phaneropterinae
 Alectoria, a genus of birds in the family Phasianidae; synonym of Alectoris
Alectoria (stone), a purportedly magic crystal, found in the gizzards of roosters